The dramatist and author W. S. Gilbert wrote approximately 80 dramatic works during his career, as well as light verse, short stories and other works.  He is best remembered for his series of 14 libretti for his joint operatic works with the composer Arthur Sullivan, but many of his other dramatic works were popular successes.

List
In the following list, the title of each work appears in the first column, along with any further information (such as the source of an adaptation).  The genre appears in the second column, and if the piece had music, the composer's name is listed in parentheses.  The theatre and date of first performance appear in the third and fourth columns.  All theatres were in London, unless otherwise stated.  The works are listed in the approximate order of composition. (In a few cases, the first performance was many years after the work was first published.)

See also
List of musical compositions by Arthur Sullivan
Bibliography of W.S. Gilbert

Notes

References

External links

 
List of Gilbert's works at The Gilbert & Sullivan Archive

 
Bibliographies by writer
Bibliographies of British writers
Dramatist and playwright bibliographies